Rear Admiral Sir Brian Stewart Murray,  (26 December 1921 – 4 June 1991) was a senior officer in the Royal Australian Navy and the 22nd Governor of Victoria, serving from March 1982 until October 1985.

Governor of Victoria
At the time of his appointment as governor, Murray was a retired Royal Australian Navy admiral married to a former nun. He was nominated by the Liberal Premier Lindsay Thompson. Labor Premier John Cain demanded his resignation in 1985 after Murray accepted a free trip to the United States with his wife from Continental Airlines. They retired to the Doonkuna Estate vineyard at Murrumbateman, outside of Canberra.

During Murray's term of office, a Labor government was elected in Victoria for the first time since 1955. Accordingly, there were some changes to the role, ceremonial and functions within Government House, Melbourne during his incumbency. The new government discontinued recommending Imperial honours. On 18 April 1984, the governor announced that Queen Elizabeth II had approved a change in his flag:

Death
When Murray died of cancer in 1991 he was accorded the honour of a state funeral by the State of Victoria, complete with Royal Australian Navy escort, full naval honours and a eulogy by his friend Admiral Sir Anthony Synnot.

References

External links
RAN Admirals: Sir Brian Stewart Murray (Royal Australian Navy)

1921 births
1991 deaths
Australian military personnel of the Korean War
Australian military personnel of the Vietnam War
Australian military personnel of World War II
Deputy Chiefs of Naval Staff (Australia)
Governors of Victoria (Australia)
Graduates of Britannia Royal Naval College
Australian Knights Commander of the Order of St Michael and St George
Officers of the Order of Australia
Royal Australian Navy admirals